Mount Tremont, elevation , is a mountain in Carroll and Grafton counties in the White Mountains of New Hampshire. It stands southwest of the town of Bartlett and directly south of Crawford Notch. It is flanked to the east by Bartlett Haystack mountain, to the northwest by the Sawyer River valley, and to the northeast by the Saco River valley. The mountain is crossed by the Brunel and Mount Tremont trails.

References

Mountains of New Hampshire
Mountains of Carroll County, New Hampshire
Mountains of Grafton County, New Hampshire